Otáez  is a town and seat of the municipality of Otáez, in the state of Durango, north-western Mexico. As of 2010, the town had a population of 871.

References

Populated places in Durango

es:Otáez (municipio)
eo:Otáez (komunumo)
pt:Otáez
vi:Otáez